Robin Pedersen (born 31 August 1996) is a Norwegian ski jumper.

At the 2016 Junior World Championships he won a silver medal in the team competition and placed 22nd in the normal hill. He made his Continental Cup debut in December 2015 in Rovaniemi, recording his first podiums in December 2018 in Lillehammer with a third place before managing back-to-back victories the next week in Ruka.

He made his FIS Ski Jumping World Cup debut in March 2018 at the Holmenkollen ski festival. He collected his first World Cup points with a 30th place on New Years' Day 2019, later breaking the top 20 with an 18th place in Bischofshofen, both as part of the 2018-19 Four Hills Tournament where he finished 33rd overall.

He represents the sports club IL Stålkameratene. He is a son of ski jumper and national team coach Trond Jøran Pedersen.

References 

1996 births
Living people
People from Rana, Norway
Norwegian male ski jumpers
Sportspeople from Nordland